Diego de Vega (1570-1630s) was a Portuguese merchant and financier. He was the first banker in Buenos Aires during the viceroyalty of Peru.

Biography 

Born 1570 in Lisboa (Portugal), belonging to a family of Jews converted to Catholicism. He arrived at the port of Buenos Aires in 1601 and was married on July 8, 1605 to Blanca de Vasconcelos, daughter of Mendo de Vasconcelos and Juana de Atouguia. 

Diego de Vega had contacts in various regions outside the Viceroyalty of Peru, Brazil and Lisboa are some of the places where he operated his business of smuggling. He came to have great wealth, becoming the richest man in Buenos Aires in the early years of the 17th century, and also was listed as one of the strongest traders in the world in his time.

References

External links 

histarmar.com.ar

1570 births
Jewish Portuguese history
People from Buenos Aires
Argentine Roman Catholics
Converts to Roman Catholicism from Judaism
Portuguese Roman Catholics